The Hohenhewen, also called the Hohenhöwen or, colloquially, Höwen, is the local mountain of the town of Engen in the Hegau region of southern Germany.

Summit area 
On its summit plateau are the ruins of Hohenhewen Castle and a viewing platform built on the remains of the old , from where the other mountains and hills of the Hegau, Lake Constance and, to the north, the Swabian Jura, can be seen. In good visibility even the Alps and the Black Forest may be made out.

Ascent 
The Hohenhewen may be ascended from Anselfingen to the north or Welschingen to the south. Whilst the northern ascent is fairly wide and comfortable (T1), the climb from Welschingen is much steeper and narrower and requires a certain degree of sure-footedness (T2). Good footwear is recommended.

Geology and nature conservation 

Like almost all Hegau mountains, the Hohenhewen has a volcanic origin. Its bedrock consists of basalt. A 39-hectare area on the Hohenhewen has been designated a nature reserve since 1982 and its steep eastern mountainside is of particular botanical interest.

Meaning of the name 
It is possible that the mountain, in turn, gave its name to the Hegau region (Hewengew).

See also 
 List of volcanoes in Germany

References

External links 

 
 

Mountains under 1000 metres
Mountains and hills of Baden-Württemberg
Konstanz (district)
Mountains and hills of the Hegau